The 33rd BRDC International Trophy was a Formula Two motor race held at Silverstone on 29 March 1981. It was the opening race of the 1981 European Formula Two Championship.

The 47-lap race was won by New Zealander Mike Thackwell, driving a works Ralt-Honda. Italian Riccardo Paletti finished second in a March-BMW entered by Onyx Race Engineering, with another Italian, Corrado Fabi, third in a works March-BMW.

Report

Entry
A total of 46 F2 cars were entered for the event, however just 31 took part in qualifying.

Qualifying
Mike Thackwell took pole position for Ralt Racing Ltd, in their Ralt-Honda RH6/81, averaging a speed of 133.59 mph.

Race
The race was held over 47 laps on a wet Silverstone Grand Prix circuit. Mike Thackwell took the winner spoils for works Ralt team, driving their Ralt-Honda RH6/81. Thackwell won in a time of 1hr 11:44.67mins., averaging a speed of 115.23 mph. Over 30 seconds behind was the second place car, driven by Riccardo Paletti, in the March Onyx Racing Team’s March-BMW 812. The podium was completed by another Italian, Corrado Fabi, in his Roloil Marlboro Racing/March Racing Ltd-entered March-BMW 812, albeit one lap adrift.

Race classification

 Fastest lap: Geoff Lees, 1:22.82 secs (125.94 mph)

References

Brdc International Trophy
European Formula Two Championship
BRDC International Trophy